The 501e-503e Régiment de chars de combat (R.C.C.) (French: '501st-503rd Combat Tank Regiment') was an armoured tank unit of the French Army. The regiment was the armoured component of the 1st Mechanised Brigade. The regiment was equipped with 80 tanks. The 503e RCC was dissolved in  2009.

History

The 501e Régiment de chars de combat (501e RCC) was merged with the 503e Régiment de chars de combat (503e RCC) in 1994 to form the 501st/503rd RCC armed with 80 Leclerc tanks.

The regiment has participated in numerous combat engagements: the relief missions in Kosovo and the former Yugoslavia, and was found on all exterior theatres of intervention (Chad, Lebanon, Kuwait, Central African Republic, as well as Senegal , the Ivory Coast and Afghanistan).

The regiment was divided into two groups of 40 Leclerc tanks, each supported by two squadrons: one of general means and the other of maintenance.

Each group of squadron can be projected in exterior theatres of operations.

The 501e-503e RCC in a complete count was constituted of 80 tanks, 500 armor and diverse vehicles articulated by 1300 men.

The 503e RCC was dissolved on June 23, 2009.

The 501e RCC remained part of the 1st Mechanized Brigade 1re BM until August 1, 2009 and accordingly integrated the 2nd Armoured Brigade 2e BB.

The 239 military personnel of the 503e reinforced the squadrons of the 501e.

Organization
The regiment had 1300 officers and soldiers and consisted of 12 squadrons:

EAS - Administration and Support Squadron
1er Groupe d’Escadron (1er GE) - 1st Squadron Group (x40 MBTs)
ECL - Command and Logistics Squadron
1er Esc - 1st Squadron
2e Esc - 2nd Squadron
3e Esc - 3rd Squadron
2e Groupe d’Escadron (2e GE) 2nd Squadron Group (x40 MBTs)
ECL - Command and Logistics Squadron
1er Esc - 1st Squadron
2e Esc - 2nd Squadron
3e Esc - 3rd Squadron
EEI - Reconnaissance Squadron
EMR - Regimental Maintenance Squadron
5e Esc - 5th Reserve Squadron

Traditions

Insignia

Regimental Commanders

1990–1992: Colonel Gallineau
1992–1994: Colonel d’Achon
1994–1996: Colonel de Parseval
1996–1998: Colonel Desportes
1998–2000: Colonel de Villiers
2000–2002: Colonel Houssay
2002–2004: Colonel Klotz
2004–2006: Colonel Goupil
2006–2008: Colonel Palu
2008–2009: Colonel Nimser (since August 1, 2009, the 501e-503e RCC was dissolved and was restructured under the designation of 501e RCC).

See also
31st Brigade

References

Tank Regiment, 501st-503rd
Military units and formations established in 1994
Military units and formations disestablished in 2009